Øyvind Brække (born 25 August 1969) is a Norwegian jazz musician (trombone), composer, music arranger and band leader, best known for Bodega Band and S. Møller Storband. He was the initiator of the popular and still active band The Source, who released several albums, and made contributions to dozens of recordings with musicians like Chick Corea, Eirik Hegdal, Per Zanussi, Erlend Skomsvoll, Trondheim Jazz Orchestra, Knut Kristiansen, Jacob Young, Trygve Seim, Per Oddvar Johansen, Mathilde Grooss Viddal, Dingobats, Sverre Gjørvad, Motorpsycho, FriEnsemblet and Come Shine.

Career 
Brække was born in Bærum, where his jazz career started in Sandvika Storband. He played on the SS recordings Come Rain or Come Shine (1989) and Contemporary Music For Big Band (1991) with them, and joined the band "Why Not" in 1990. He studied on the Jazz program at Trondheim Musikkonsevatorium (1991–93), and was a member of several bands on the Trondheim jazz scene, including Bodega Band from 1992 (recording. 1992) and S. Møller big band, which he led. Great luck did student band "The Source" which he co-founded in 1992. The quartet has so far made seven CDs, "Olemann cornet" 1994, "Of Christmas" 1995, "The MotorSourceMassacre" 2000, "The Source and different cikada" 2002, "Of Christmas Live at Blue", 2002, "The Source" 2005 and "The Source of Christmas Live" (released 2007). It has completed a number of tours and festival gigs, including along with the rock band Motorpsycho and string quartet Cicada.

In 1998 Brække moved permanently back to Oslo where he established himself in various bands. Beside The Source, he has had a long engagements with Trondheim Jazz Orchestra, evidenced by the albums Live in Molde (2000), We are? (2004), What if? (2009), Morning songs (TJO & Per Zanussi, 2009) and not least his own significant project with ), Migrations TJO & Øyvind Brække, performed in trondheim 2009 and released on album in 2011.

Discography 
Within "Sandvika Storband»
1989: Come Rain or Come Shine (SS Records)
1991: Contemporary Music For Big Band (SS Records)
2011: A Novel Approach (SS Records), as guest soloist

Within The Source (Trygve Seim & Per Oddvar Johansen)
1994: Olemanns Kornett (Curling Legs)
2000: Roadwork Vol. 2: The MotorSourceMassacre (Stickman Records, Germany), with Motorpsycho & Deathprod
2002: The Source And Different Cikadas (ECM Records), with
2005: The Source: Of Christmas (Curling Legs)
2006: The Source (ECM Records)
2007: Live (Grappa Music)

Within Trondheim Jazz Orchestra
2000: Live in Molde (MNJ Records), TJO & Chick Corea
2004: We are? (Jazzaway Records), TJO & Eirik Hegdal
2009: What if? A Counterfactual Fairytale (MNJ Records), TJO & Erlend Skomsvoll
2009: Morning songs (MNJ Records), TJO & Per Zanussi
2011: Migrations (MNJ Records), TJO & Brække

Within Trygve Seim
2000: Different Rivers (NorCD)
2004: Sangam (NorCD)

Within Crimetime Orchestra
2005: Life Is A Beautiful Monster (Jazzaway Records), feat. Bjørnar Andresen
2009: Atomic Symphony (Jazzaway Records), feat. Sonny Simmons & KORK

Within Mathilde Grooss Viddal, FriEnsemblet
2005: Holding Balance (Giraffa Records)
2009: Come Closer (Giraffa Records)
2012: Undergroove (Giraffa Records), with Mathilde Grooss Viddal & Friensemblet
2015: El Aaiun - across the Border (Giraffa Records), feat Safaa al Saadi
2017: Out of Silence (Giraffa Records), feat Naïssam Jalal and Mathilde Grooss Viddal

With other projects
1995: Monk Moods (Odin Records), with Knut Kristiansen
1995: Letters (Turn Left Prod.), with Håvard Lund
1999: History And Movement (Via Music), with Didrik Ingvaldsen & Pocket Corner
1999: Utopian Dances (Krusedull Prod.), with Jono el Grande
1999: Glow (Curling Legs), with Jacob Young
2001: Pöck, within Dingobats
2001: Denne Lille Pytten Er Et Hav, within Sverre Gjørvad
2002: Variasjoner (Vossajazz Records), with Erlend Skomsvoll live at Vossajazz 2002
2003: Heaven (ACT), with Christof Lauer & Norwegian Brass with Sondre Bratland, Rebekka Bakken & Geir Lysne
2003: In Concert (Curling Legs), within Come Shine, with The Norwegian Radio Orchestra
2005: Krissvit (Moserobie Records), with Torbjörn Zetterberg
2006: Denada (ACT), within Helge Sunde's Norske Store Orkester feat. Olga Konkova & Marilyn Mazur
2006: Holdin Balance (Giraffa), with Mathilde Grooss Viddal & Friensemblet
2007: Sudoku (Real Records), within Sharp Nine
2008: Fabatune (Curling Legs), with Lars Andreas Haug
2009: Come Closer (Giraffa), with Mathilde Grooss Viddal & Friensemblet
2009: Cycle of silence (ACT), with Frøy Aagre

References

External links 
Migrations – Øyvind Brække on Trondheim Jazz Orchestra website

20th-century Norwegian trombonists
21st-century Norwegian trombonists
Norwegian jazz trombonists
Male trombonists
Norwegian jazz composers
Norwegian University of Science and Technology alumni
Musicians from Bærum
ECM Records artists
Living people
1969 births
21st-century trombonists
Male jazz composers
20th-century Norwegian male musicians
21st-century Norwegian male musicians
Ensemble Denada members
Trondheim Jazz Orchestra members
The Source (band) members
Grappa Music artists